Gagik Ghazanchyan (born on May 22, 1960 in Yerevan) is an Armenian artist.

Biography 
Gagik Ghazanchyan was born in 1960 in Yerevan. During the period of 1975–1979 he studied at Terlemezian Fine Arts College of Yerevan, 1984–1990 at Fine Arts and Drama Institute of Yerevan. Since 1992 Ghazanchyan is a member of Artists' Union of Armenia.

Exhibitions

Solo exhibitions 
 2016 “Colors from Distant Lands", Gainsbourg, AvestArt, Zurich, Switzerland
 2014 “Other images from the city”, National Center of aesthetics, Yerevan
 2011 “Contemporary Art from Armenia” Art Gallery RUF, Zurich, Switzerland
 2010 Modern Art Museum of  Yerevan, Armenia
 2005, 2009 “Martin Gallery”, Sissach, Switzerland
 2005 Fairmont Hotel, San Francisco, USA
 2000 Artists’ Museum, Washington, DC (sponsored by Phillip Morris International)

Group exhibitions 
Gagik Ghazanchyan started to participate in group exhibions in Armenia, Artsakh, France, Beyrut, Spain, Belarus, Lebanon, United States, Switzerland, Germany, Italy.

Collections
Gagik Ghazanchyan's artworks can be found at National Gallery of Armenia, Modern Art Museum of Yerevan.

Family
 Wife - Lilit Soghomonyan, painter
 Son - Guy Ghazanchyan, painter, sculptor

Publication
 Gagik Ghazanchyan, Modern Art Museum of Armenia, 2008, Yerevan, .

Gallery

References

External links
Official web page 
Gagik Ghazanchyan's solo exhibition at Modern Art Museum of Yerevan

1960 births
Living people
Artists from Yerevan
Armenian painters
20th-century painters
21st-century Armenian painters